SheepShaver is an open-source PowerPC Apple Macintosh emulator originally designed for BeOS and Linux. The name is a play on ShapeShifter, a Macintosh II emulator for AmigaOS (made obsolete by Basilisk II). The ShapeShifter and SheepShaver projects were originally conceived and programmed by Christian Bauer. However, currently, the main developer behind SheepShaver is Gwenolé Beauchesne.

History

SheepShaver was originally commercial software when first released in 1998, but after the demise of Be Inc., the maker of BeOS, it became open source in 2002. It can be run on both PowerPC and x86 systems; however, it runs more slowly on an x86 system than on a PowerPC system, because of the translation between the PowerPC and Intel x86 instruction sets. SheepShaver has also been ported to Microsoft Windows. 

As a free software, a few variants exist to simplify the installation process on Intel-based Macs:
 ‘Sheep Shaver Wrapper’ is built off of Sheep Shaver but it does some of the bundling work for the user.
 'Chubby Bunny' also simplifies the set up process of OS 9 visualization on Intel Macs running OS X.

Features

SheepShaver is capable of running Mac OS 7.5.2 through 9.0.4 (though it needs the image of an Old World ROM to run Mac OS 8.1 or below), and can be run inside a window so that the user can run classic Mac OS and either BeOS, Intel-based Mac OS X, Linux, or Windows applications at the same time.

Although SheepShaver does have Ethernet support and CD-quality sound output, it does not emulate the memory management unit. While adding MMU emulation has been discussed, the feature has not been added because of the effort required in implementing it, the impact on performance it will have and the lack of time on the part of the developers.

See also 

 PearPC
 vMac
 Basilisk II
 Classic Environment
 Executor

References

External links
 
 SheepShaver for x86 
 E-Maculation forum on SheepShaver
 SheepShaver for Windows setup guide
 SheepShaver for OSX setup guide
 Gwenole Beauchesne's SheepShaver page (archived)

Free emulation software
Linux emulation software
MacOS emulation software
Macintosh platform emulators
PowerPC emulators